Julie Doiron / Okkervil River is an album release, a CD split between Julie Doiron and alternative country band Okkervil River, was released on July 23, 2003.

Track listing
"The Sweetest Eyes (When You Laugh)" – Julie Doiron
"Snow Falls in November" – Julie Doiron
"The Songwriter" – Julie Doiron
"The Wrong Guy" – Julie Doiron
"Cancel the Party" – Julie Doiron
"He Passes Number Thirty-Three" – Okkervil River
"Omie Wise" – Okkervil River
"A Leaf" – Okkervil River
"Blackest Coat" – Okkervil River
"The Sweetest Eyes (When You Laugh)" – Julie Doiron and her children (uncredited hidden track)

2003 albums
Julie Doiron albums
Okkervil River albums
Split albums